In enzymology, a hydrogensulfite reductase is an enzyme that catalyzes the chemical reaction

trithionate + acceptor + 2 H2O + OH-  3 bisulfite + reduced acceptor

The 4 substrates of this enzyme are trithionate, acceptor, H2O, and OH-, whereas its two products are bisulfite and reduced acceptor.

This enzyme belongs to the family of oxidoreductases, specifically those acting on a sulfur group of donors with other acceptors.  The systematic name of this enzyme class is trithionate:acceptor oxidoreductase. Other names in common use include bisulfite reductase, dissimilatory sulfite reductase, desulfoviridin, desulforubidin, desulfofuscidin, dissimilatory-type sulfite reductase, and trithionate:(acceptor) oxidoreductase.  It has 4 cofactors: iron, sulfur, siroheme,  and iron-sulfur.

References

 
 
 

EC 1.8.99
Iron enzymes
Sulfur enzymes
Siroheme enzymes
Iron-sulfur enzymes
Enzymes of unknown structure